Krasnokutsky District is an administrative and municipal district (raion), one of the thirty-eight in Saratov Oblast, Russia. It is located in the south of the oblast. Its administrative center is the town of Krasny Kut. Population: 34,676 (2010 Census);  The population of Krasny Kut accounts for 41.6% of the district's total population.

References

Notes

Sources

Districts of Saratov Oblast